The bontebok (Damaliscus pygargus) is an antelope found in South Africa, Lesotho and Namibia. D. pygargus has two subspecies; the nominate subspecies (D. p. pygargus), occurring naturally in the Fynbos and Renosterveld areas of the Western Cape, and the blesbok (D. p. phillipsi) occurring in the Highveld.

The bontebok is related to the common tsessebe.

Description

The bontebok is a tall, medium-sized antelope. Males are slightly larger and noticeably heavier than females. The bontebok is a chocolate brown colour, with a white underside and a white stripe from the forehead to the tip of the nose, although there is a brown stripe across the white near the eyes in most blesbok. The bontebok also has a distinctive white patch around its tail (hence the Latin name), while this patch is light brown/tan in the blesbok. The horns of the bontebok are lyre-shaped and clearly ringed. They are found in both sexes and can reach a length of half a metre.

Habitat
Blesbok live in the Highveld, where they eat short grasses, while bontebok are restricted to the coastal Fynbos and the Renosterveld. They are diurnal, though they rest during the heat of the day. Herds contain only males, only females, or are mixed, and do not exceed 40 animals for bontebok or 70 for blesbok.

Behavior

Bontebok are not good jumpers, but they are very good at crawling under things. Mature males form territories and face down other males in displays and occasionally fight them.

Conservation
Bontebok were once extensively killed as pests, and by the early 20th century were reduced to a wild population of just 17 individuals. The species was saved from certain extinction when Dutch farmer Alexander van der Bijl corralled the remaining individuals into a fence, which they were unable to jump out of. In 1931, this herd of 17 was transferred to Bontebok National Park, which was established for the explicit purpose of conservation of the species. By the time the park was relocated to better suit the needs of the bontebok in 1961, the herd had grown to 61 members. Today, their population is estimated to range from 2,500 to 3,000, all descendants of the original herd of 17 members.

While Bontebok are extinct in their natural habitat, they have increased in population to the point where they are now very abundant and avidly farmed, because they are popular quarry for hunters and are easy to sustain.

In culture 
The bontebok is the provincial animal of Western Cape.

References 

 Skead, C.J., 1980. Historical mammal incidence in the Cape Province Volume 1. The Department of Nature and Environmental Conservation of the Provincial Administration of the Cape of Good Hope, Cape Town.

Damaliscus
Mammals of South Africa
Mammals of Lesotho
Mammals of Namibia
Afrikaans words and phrases
Mammals of Southern Africa
Fynbos
Renosterveld
Mammals described in 1767
Taxa named by Peter Simon Pallas